Guyana competed at the 2004 Summer Olympics in Athens, Greece, from 13 to 29 August 2004. This was the nation's fourteenth appearance at the Olympics as an independent nation, although it had previously competed in five other games as British Guiana. Guyana did not compete in the 1976 Summer Olympics in Montreal because of its partial support to the African boycott.

Athletics 

Guyanese athletes have so far achieved qualifying standards in the following athletics events (up to a maximum of 3 athletes in each event at the 'A' Standard, and 1 at the 'B' Standard). 

Women

Key
Note–Ranks given for track events are within the athlete's heat only
Q = Qualified for the next round
q = Qualified for the next round as a fastest loser or, in field events, by position without achieving the qualifying target
NR = National record
N/A = Round not applicable for the event
Bye = Athlete not required to compete in round

Swimming 

Men

Weightlifting

See also
Guyana at the 2003 Pan American Games

References

External links
Official Report of the XXVIII Olympiad

Nations at the 2004 Summer Olympics
2004 Summer Olympics
Olympics